The 1966 Grand National was the 120th renewal of the Grand National horse race that took place at Aintree near Liverpool, England, on 26 March 1966.

The winner was Anglo by 20 lengths, giving Freddie second place for a second consecutive year.

The winning jockey Tim Norman had been injured in a car accident two days earlier.

Finishing order

Non-finishers

Media coverage

David Coleman presented Grand National Grandstand on the BBC. The seventh successive year the race was broadcast live and the sixth time Coleman fronted the coverage. Peter O'Sullevan, Bob Haynes and Tony Preston were the commentators.

References

 1966
Grand National
Grand National
Grand National
20th century in Lancashire